"St. Louis" is a song by Australian rock group the Easybeats, which was released in June 1969. It was co-written by its members Harry Vanda and George Young and recorded as their first single after signing to Polydor Records.

Reception

The NME gave the song a positive review, saying: "It drives along at breathtaking pace and will knock you into submission so that you’ll be forced to buy it. I hope."

The single peaked at #21 in Australia and #57 in Canada. In the United States, it peaked at #72 on the Cash Box Top 100 and #100 on the US Billboard Hot 100 chart. It failed to chart in the UK.

During the 1969 Australian tour, band members told Go-Set they were disappointed in Ray Singer's production work. Lead singer Stevie Wright stated they "wanted it (more) funky with a lot of ad-lib(s)." He also cited a rumour that Paul McCartney had heard the song on his car radio and stopped to ask the station to "play it again" (this story is often attributed to another Easybeats' song, "Good Times").

Track listing

"St. Louis"
"Can't Find Love"

Charts

Little River Band version

Australian rock music group Little River Band recorded a cover version which was released in November 1982 as the second single from their album Greatest Hits Vol. 2. The song peaked at number 43 on the Australian Kent Music Report singles chart.

Track listing

 Australian 7" (Capitol CP-867)
A. "St. Louis" - 3:35
B. "Easy Money" - 4:00

Charts

References

1969 singles
1982 singles
The Easybeats songs
Little River Band songs
Songs written by Harry Vanda
Songs written by George Young (rock musician)
Polydor Records singles
Albert Productions singles
1969 songs
Songs about St. Louis